Shamsul Haque Chowdhury is a Bangladesh Awami League politician and the former Member of Parliament of Rangpur-12.

Career
Chowdhury was elected to parliament from Rangpur-12 as an Awami League candidate in 1973. He was elected to parliament from Rangpur-13 as a Awami League candidate in 1979.

References

Awami League politicians
Living people
1st Jatiya Sangsad members
2nd Jatiya Sangsad members
Year of birth missing (living people)